Banfa Sylla (born 29 May 1989) is a French football defender.

Career
He played with Vannes OC in France between 2007 and 2010. He moved to Lorca Atlético CF and played in the Spanish Segunda División B during the 2010–11 season. In summer 2011 he moved to Serbia and signed with FK Rad. He made his debut in the SuperLiga in a match against FK Novi Pazar in which he was an used substitute.  In April 2013 he joined German club ASV Durlach.

Personal
Born in the French capital, Paris, Sylla has also Senegalese descent.

References

External links
 
 Banfa Sylla at EuroRivals

1989 births
Living people
French footballers
French expatriate footballers
French sportspeople of Senegalese descent
Association football defenders
Footballers from Paris
Vannes OC players
Expatriate footballers in Spain
FK Rad players
Serbian SuperLiga players
Expatriate footballers in Serbia
Expatriate footballers in Germany
ASV Durlach players
Lorca Atlético CF players